The following is a list of ambassadors of France to Belgium.  It also includes top-ranking French diplomats in Belgium who did not formally have the ambassador title.

The three main sources used to build the list are the website of the French Embassy in Brussels, a more formal list of French ambassadors post-World War II compiled by the French Ministry of Foreign Affairs, and two more detailed lists of high-ranking diplomats which only cover parts of the 19th century. Additional references are provided below for specific individuals.

See also
 Belgium–France relations

References

 
France
Belgium